"Once" is a song by the American rock band Pearl Jam. Featuring lyrics written by vocalist Eddie Vedder and music written by guitarist Stone Gossard, "Once" is the first track on the band's debut album, Ten (1991). On Ten, it is preceded by a brief interlude of the album's closing hidden track, "Master/Slave". Besides Ten, the song was also featured as a B-side on the single for "Alive". Remixed versions of the song were included on Pearl Jam's 2004 greatest hits album, Rearviewmirror (Greatest Hits 1991–2003), and the 2009 Ten reissue. The song is one of the band's heaviest compositions to date.

Origin and recording
"Once" features lyrics written by vocalist Eddie Vedder and music written by guitarist Stone Gossard. The song originated as an instrumental demo titled "Agyptian Crave" that was written by Gossard in 1990. The instrumental was one of five songs compiled onto a tape called Stone Gossard Demos '91 that was circulated in the hopes of finding a singer and drummer for the group.

The tape made its way into the hands of Vedder, who was working as a gas station attendant in San Diego, California at the time. He listened to the tape shortly before going surfing, where lyrics came to him. Vedder recorded vocals for three of the songs on the demo tape, one of which was "Once", and mailed the tape back to Seattle. Upon hearing the tape, the band invited Vedder to come to Seattle and he was asked to join the band.

Lyrics
"Once" is the middle chapter of a trilogy of songs in what Vedder later described as a "mini-opera" entitled Mamasan, with it being preceded by "Alive" and followed by "Footsteps". "Once" tells the tale of a man's descent into madness which leads him into becoming a serial killer.

During the bridge of the song, Vedder can be heard muttering. He is actually saying "You think I got my eyes closed/But I'm lookin' at you the whole fuckin' time..."

Reception
Stephen M. Deusner of Pitchfork Media said, "On songs like 'Once', with its insistent breakdowns...there's a hardscrabble dynamic that the band would be unable to capture on subsequent releases." "Once" has received considerable radio airplay as Pearl Jam's popularity has endured.

In March 2009, "Once" was made available as downloadable content for the Rock Band series as a master track as part of the album Ten. The song was featured in the Cold Case episode "Into the Blue" in 2009.

Live performances
"Once" was first performed live at the band's October 22, 1990 concert in Seattle, Washington at the Off Ramp Café. Live performances of "Once" can be found on the "Dissident"/Live in Atlanta box set, various official bootlegs, the Live at the Gorge 05/06 box set, and the Drop in the Park LP included in the Super Deluxe edition of the Ten reissue.

References

External links

Lyrics at pearljam.com

1991 songs
Pearl Jam songs
Songs written by Eddie Vedder
Songs written by Stone Gossard
Song recordings produced by Eddie Vedder
Song recordings produced by Stone Gossard
Song recordings produced by Jeff Ament
Song recordings produced by Mike McCready
Song recordings produced by Dave Krusen
Song recordings produced by Rick Parashar
Works about serial killers